Eutane trimochla is a moth of the subfamily Arctiinae. It was described by Turner in 1940. It is known from Queensland, Australia.

References

Lithosiini
Moths described in 1940